The Hastings & St. Leonards Observer, commonly known as just the Hastings Observer, is an English weekly tabloid newspaper, published every Friday since 1859 in Hastings, East Sussex.

History
First published in 1859, The Observer is the town's only weekly newspaper. Nowadays, the paper is edited and created by Sussex Newspapers, and printed by Johnston Press at their headquarters in Hilsea, Portsmouth. Prior to this, the paper was produced in a building purposely designed for the paper, the F.J. Parsons Printworks (Observer Building).

References

External links
 Hastings Observer website

Newspapers published in Sussex
Hastings
Newspapers established in 1859
1859 establishments in England